The 1978–79 Allsvenskan was the 45th season of the top division of Swedish handball. 12 teams competed in the league. IK Heim won the regular season, but HK Drott won the playoffs and claimed their third Swedish title. HF Olympia and Kiruna AIF were relegated.

League table

Playoffs

Semifinals
 HK Drott–IK Heim 23–21, 24–25, 18–16 (HK Drott advance to the finals)
 LUGI–Ystads IF 12–12, 18–18, 15–16 a.e.t. (Ystads IF advance to the finals)

Finals
 HK Drott–Ystads IF 17–16, 19–19 (HK Drott champions)

References 

Swedish handball competitions